The right colic vein drains the ascending colon, and is a tributary of the superior mesenteric vein.  It travels with its corresponding artery, the right colic artery.

Veins of the torso